Kishni is a town in Mainpuri district in the Indian state of Uttar Pradesh.

Geography
It has an average elevation of 153 metres (501 feet).

Demographics
 India census, Kishni had a population of 11,098, 5,832 males and 5,266 females. Kishni had an average literacy rate of 81.25%, higher than the state average of 67.68: male literacy was 87.5%, and female literacy was 74.32. In Kishni, 14.03% of the population (1557) was under 6 years of age.

Nearby cities
 Etawah

References

Cities and towns in Mainpuri district